A verger is a person who assists in the ordering of religious services.

Verger or The Verger may also refer to:
 Verger (surname)
 El Verger, a town in Marina Alta, Alicante, Valencian Community, Spain
 Le Verger, a commune in Ille-et-Vilaine, Bretagne, France
 Saint-Quentin-le-Verger, a commune in the Marne department in north-eastern France
 "The Verger", a 1929 short story by Somerset Maugham
 "The Verger", a segment of the 1950 anthology film Trio, based on the short story

See also
 Vergere